Eastern Shores is a neighborhood within the city of North Miami Beach in Miami-Dade County, Florida, United States.

Geography
Eastern Shores is made up of 9 named streets: 

 NE 35th Ave (Eastern Shores Blvd)
 NE 164th St, NE 165th Street
 NE 166th Street
 NE 167th Street
 NE 168th Street
 NE 169th Street
 NE 170th Street
 NE 171st Street. 

The avenues go from 29th Avenue to 40th Avenue. 

The neighborhood is made up of man-made canals, except the natural canal on the north side of NE 171st Street. Eastern Shores is bounded by Sunny Isles Blvd to the south, Maule Lake to the west, The Intracoastal Waterway to the east, and Dumfoundling Bay to the northeast.  Eastern Shores is located next to Sunny Isles Beach.

The right side of Eastern Shores (East Side) is full of condominiums and townhouses. Eastern Shores is a gated community. This guardhouse and guard gates were created in 1997. Eastern Shores operates Eastern Shores Fire Rescue station that is located next to the guardhouse. Eastern Shores is located next to the Intracoastal Mall.

History
Eastern Shores was a mangroves wetland, until it was landfilled in the late 1950s.

Education
Eastern Shores is within the Miami-Dade County Public Schools system.

Students attend Norman S. Edelcup/Sunny Isles Beach K-8 in Sunny Isles Beach for elementary and K-8. Residents who want a standard comprehensive middle school instead of a K-8 enroll at a separate middle school, Highland Oaks Middle School. Alonzo and Tracy Mourning Senior High Biscayne Bay Campus is the senior high school. Prior to its opening in 2009, Dr. Michael M. Krop Senior High School served Eastern Shores.

References

Neighborhoods in North Miami Beach, Florida